Vietnam Enterprise Investments Limited is a Cayman Islands-registered, closed-end investment trust managed by Dragon Capital It is invested in listed equity on the Ho Chi Minh and Hanoi stock exchanges in Vietnam. Established in 1995, and listed on the LSE, the fund is a constituent of the FTSE 250 Index with a net asset value of US$2.5bn (unaudited September 2021). The chairman is Stanley Chou. The portfolio manager is Vu Huu Dien.

The Bill and Melinda Gates Foundation is the largest shareholder, owning 11.5% of the company, followed by Sirius Investment Fund, which owns 10.1%, and City of London Investment Management Company, which owns an 8.7% stake.

Holdings
As of December 31, 2021, its top 10 holdings are:

Some other major holdings with unknown percentages of NAV are:
 VCSC (Bao Viet Securities) (HNX:TC6)
 Phu Nhuan Jewelry (HOSE:PNJ)
 Viglacera Corporation (HNX:VGC)
 Vietnam Innovative Startup Accelerator (VIISA) 
 Saigon Securities Incorporation (HOSE:SSI)
 Ho Chi Minh City Securities Corporation (HOSE:HCM)
 Vietnam Engine and Agricultural Machinery Corporation (VEAM) (HNX:VEA)

References

External links
 
 

Financial services companies established in 1995
Investment trusts of the United Kingdom
Companies listed on the London Stock Exchange